Elections to Liverpool City Council were held on 1 November 1933. One third of the council seats were up for election, the term of office of each councillor being three years.

Thirteen of the thirty nine seats up for election were uncontested.

After the election, the composition of the council was:

Election result

Ward results

* - Councillor seeking re-election

Comparisons are made with the 1930 election results.

Abercromby

Aigburth

Allerton

Anfield

Breckfield

Brunswick

Castle Street

Childwall

Croxteth

Dingle

Edge Hill

Everton

Exchange

Fairfield

Fazakerley

Garston

Granby

Great George

Kensington

Kirkdale

Low Hill

Much Woolton

Netherfield

North Scotland

Old Swan

Prince's Park

Sandhills

St. Anne's

St. Domingo

St. Peter's

Sefton Park East

Sefton Park West

South Scotland

Vauxhall

Walton

Warbreck

Wavertree

Wavertree West

West Derby

Aldermanic Elections

Aldermanic Election 2 May 1934

Caused by the death on 18 September 1933 of Alderman William Wallace Kelly (Conservative, last elected as an alderman on 9 November 1932).

Aldermanic Election 6 June 1934

Caused by the death on 20 April 1934 of Alderman Sir Max Muspratt Bart. (Conservative, last elected as an alderman on 9 November 1932, in whose place, his widow, Councillor Lady Helena Agnes Dalrymple Muspratt J.P., (Conservative, elected to the Childwall ward on 1 November 1932) was elected by the councillors as an alderman on 6 June 1934

By-elections

No. 12 Dingle 20 March 1934

Caused by the resignation of Councillor William Jones (Labour, last elected 1 November 1932).

No. 38 Childwall 26 June 1934

Caused by the election as an alderman on 6 June 1934 of Councillor Lady Helena Agnes Dalrymple Muspratt J.P, (Conservative, elected to the Childwall ward on 1 November 1932) following the death on 20 April 1934 of her husband, Alderman Sir Max Muspratt Bart. (Conservative, last elected as an alderman on 9 November 1932.

See also

 Liverpool City Council
 Liverpool Town Council elections 1835 - 1879
 Liverpool City Council elections 1880–present
 Mayors and Lord Mayors of Liverpool 1207 to present
 History of local government in England

References

1933
1933 English local elections
1930s in Liverpool